Jeffrey Stahmann is a prolific inventor with over 300 US issued patents. His inventions include patient monitoring, diagnosis, and/or therapy systems and methods.

Stahmann has received the 1985 H.W. Sweatt Award for the development of very high speed integrated circuit (VHSIC) technology, and the 2002 Mirowski Technical Achievement Award for "sustained engineering and scientific accomplishments on implantable medical devices." He is affiliated with Boston Scientific.

References 

Year of birth missing (living people)
Living people
21st-century American inventors
American patent holders